The Islamic State – Caucasus Province (IS-CP; , ad-Dawlah al-Islāmiyah – Wilayah al-Qawqaz, Vilayat Kavkaz Islamskogo gosudarstva) was a branch of the militant Islamist group Islamic State (IS), that was active in the North Caucasus region of Russia. IS announced the group's formation on 23 June 2015 and appointed Rustam Asildarov as its leader. Although it was defeated by 2017, some lone wolves acted on behalf of the Caucasus Province for several years afterwards.

Background
Starting in November 2014, mid-level commanders of the Caucasus Emirate militant group began publicly switching their allegiance from Emirate leader Aliaskhab Kebekov to IS leader Abu Bakr al-Baghdadi, following al-Baghdadi and his group's declaration of a caliphate earlier in the year. By February 2015, many commanders of the Emirate's branches in Chechnya (Vilayat Nokhchicho) and Dagestan (Vilayat Dagestan) had defected. Kebekov and senior loyalists within the Emirate released statements denouncing them, and accused the most senior defector, Rustam Asildarov, of betrayal. Further pledges of allegiance to al-Baghdadi occurred in June 2015 by Vilayat Nokhchicho leader Aslan Byutukayev, and in an audio statement purportedly made by militants in Dagestan, Chechnya, Ingushetia, and Kabardino-Balkaria.

History
On 23 June 2015, ISIL's spokesman Abu Mohammad al-Adnani accepted these pledges and announced the creation of a new Wilayah, or Province, covering the North Caucasus region. Adnani named Asildarov as the IS leader of this area and called on other militants in the region to follow him.

The group claimed responsibility for its first attack, on a Russian military base in southern Dagestan, on 2 September 2015. In a video also released in September, Asildarov called on IS supporters in the Caucasus to join the fight there, rather than travel to Iraq and Syria.

On 4 December 2016, Russian security services reported that they had killed Asildarov and four of his associates in a raid on a house in Makhachkala.

On 18 February 2018, a 22-year-old man opened fire on a church in Kizlyar, killing 5 and injuring 5. The attacker was later killed by security forces and a video later emerged of the attacker pledging allegiance to the Islamic State, while the Islamic State also claimed responsibility.

On 20 August 2018, multiple terrorists of young age attacked a police station in Grozny with knives and injured at least 7 police officers. All terrorists were killed; the Islamic State claimed responsibility.

In early January 2019, the group claimed responsibility for the 2018 Magnitogorsk building collapse, and an attack the following day. The group said that the building collapse was caused by bombings. The claim was, however, dismissed by some Russian investigators, who said that the cause of the building collapse was most likely a gas leak.

On 25 January 2019, a group of policemen were attacked by a gunman, in the settlement of Sernovodskoye (Kursky district), causing the injuries of two policemen. The policemen fired back, killing the attacker, whose body was later found next to a Kalashnikov in a forest. The Islamic State group later claimed responsibility for the attack.

On 12 April 2019, in an extensive operation involving Alpha Group, local police and Rosgvardia, 2 heavily armed ISIS terrorists were killed in city of Tyumen. These terrorists were planning to attack the city's public place.

On 23 June 2019, a knife-wielding terrorist attacked two police officers just outside Ramzan Kadyrov's residence in Grozny. The assailant was then killed by the police. A hunting rifle was reportedly found in his car. The Islamic State group later claimed responsibility for the attack.

On 2 July 2019, a law enforcement officer was killed and several others injured at a checkpoint on the outskirts of Bamut, when a terrorist managed to attack police officers with a knife and a hand grenade. The Islamic State group later claimed responsibility for the attack.

Designation as a terrorist organization
IS-CP was designated as a Specially Designated Global Terrorist (SDGT) organization by the United States on 29 September 2015; Aslan Avgazarovich Byutukaev was listed as a SDGT individual on 13 July 2016.

See also
 Secession in Russia
 List of clashes in the North Caucasus in 2016
 List of clashes in the North Caucasus in 2017
 List of clashes in the North Caucasus in 2018

References

Islamic terrorism in Russia
Jihadist groups
Pan-Islamism
Separatism in Russia
Factions of the Islamic State of Iraq and the Levant
Islamic State of Iraq and the Levant and Russia
Organizations designated as terrorist by the United States
Islam in the Caucasus